Puebla Air Lines (PAL Aerolineas, S.A. de C.V.) was a Mexican airline based in Puebla, Puebla. The airline started operations in 1985 and operated scheduled services until 1995.

History

The airline was founded in 1984 and begin commercial operations in 1985. The airline was sold in the early 1990s and became affiliate of TAESA until PAL's collapse on June 1995. The airline continued to fly international charter services until 2001 between Mexico and the U.S., under 14 CFR Part 129. 14 CFR Part 129 is, "Foreign air carriers and foreign operators of U.S.-registered aircraft engaged in common carriage".

Destinations

CancunCancún International Airport
ChihuahuaGeneral Roberto Fierro Villalobos International Airport
GuadalajaraDon Miguel Hidalgo y Costilla International Airport
Mexico CityBenito Juarez International Airport
MonterreyGeneral Mariano Escobedo International Airport
MoreliaGeneral Francisco J. Mujica International Airport
PueblaHermanos Serdán International Airport
QuerétaroIng. Fernando Espinoza Gutiérrez International Airport
TijuanaGeneral Abelardo L. Rodríguez International Airport

Fleet

2 Boeing 727

References 

Companies based in Puebla
Defunct airlines of Mexico
Airlines established in 1985
Airlines disestablished in 1995
1995 disestablishments in Mexico
Mexican companies established in 1985